is a Japanese former competitive figure skater. He is the 2017–18 Junior Grand Prix Final bronze medalist, the 2017 JGP Latvia champion, and the 2017–18 Japanese junior national champion. He finished within the top ten at the 2018 World Junior Championships.

Personal life 
Sumoto was born on 4 February 2001 in Izumiotsu, Osaka, Japan.

His figure skating idol is Yuzuru Hanyu.

Career

Early career 
Competing at the Japan Novice Championships, Sumoto placed 10th in the 2011–12 season, 12th in 2012–13, and 8th in 2013–14.

During the 2015–16 figure skating season, Sumoto debuted on the ISU Junior Grand Prix circuit, placing 7th in Colorado Springs, Colorado. The following season, he placed fifth in Ostrava, Czech Republic, before winning a bronze medal in Dresden, Germany.

2017–18 season 

Sumoto started the 2017–18 season with a gold medal at 2017 JGP Latvia and a 4th-place finish at 2017 JGP Croatia. His results qualified him for the 2017-18 Junior Grand Prix Final. He won the 2017–18 Japanese Junior National title in November, placing first in both segments of the competition. At the 2017–18 Junior Grand Prix Final, Sumoto won the bronze medal, placing third in both the short program and the free skate.

He placed 6th on the senior level at the 2017-18 Japan Figure Skating Championships and was assigned to the 2018 World Junior Figure Skating Championships, where he placed third in the short program and ninth in the free skate, finishing in ninth place overall. Sumoto revealed that he had injured his ankle in mid-February during training and competed while taking painkillers.

2018–19 season 
Sumoto started his season at the beginning of August, with a 4th-place finish on the senior level at 2018 CS Asian Trophy. He went on to take the silver medal at JGP Slovakia.

2020–21 season 
Sumoto was assigned to compete at the 2020 NHK Trophy but withdrew with a fever. He was later diagnosed with gastroenteritis. He subsequently competed at the 2020–21 Japan Championships, placing fourteenth.

2021–22 season 
Sumoto placed fifteenth at the 2021–22 Japan Championships.

2022–23 season 
After coming twenty-fourth at the 2022–23 Japan Championships, Sumoto announced his decision to retire from competitive skating.

Programs

Competitive highlights

2016-17 to Present 
GP: Grand Prix; CS: Challenger Series; JGP: Junior Grand Prix

2010-11 to 2015-16

Detailed results

Senior level

Junior level 

Small medals are awarded at ISU championships only. Personal bests highlighted in bold.

References 

2001 births
Living people
Japanese male single skaters
Kansai University alumni
People from Izumiōtsu, Osaka